1053 Vigdis, provisional designation , is a bright background asteroid from the central regions of the asteroid belt, approximately  in diameter. It was discovered on 16 November 1925, by German astronomer Max Wolf at the Heidelberg-Königstuhl State Observatory in Heidelberg, Germany. The meaning of the asteroids's name is unknown.

Orbit and classification 

Vigdis is a non-family asteroid of the main belt's background population. It orbits the Sun in the central asteroid belt at a distance of 2.4–2.9 AU once every 4 years and 3 months (1,544 days; semi-major axis of 2.61 AU). Its orbit has an eccentricity of 0.10 and an inclination of 8° with respect to the ecliptic. The asteroid was first observed at Algiers Observatory on 15 November 1925. The body's observation arc begins at Heidelberg with its official discovery observation the following night.

Physical characteristics 

According to the survey carried out by the NEOWISE mission of NASA's Wide-field Infrared Survey Explorer, Vigdis measures 9.110 kilometers in diameter and its surface has an albedo of 0.389. As of 2018, no rotational lightcurve of Vigdis has been obtained from photometric observations. The body's rotation period, pole and shape remain unknown.

Naming 

Any reference of this minor planet's name to a person or occurrence is unknown. "Vigdis" is an 
antiquated female first name used in Scandinavia and Iceland.

Unknown meaning 

Among the many thousands of named minor planets, Vigdis is one of 120 asteroids for which no official naming citation has been published.

References

External links 
 Asteroid Lightcurve Database (LCDB), query form (info )
 Dictionary of Minor Planet Names, Google books
 Asteroids and comets rotation curves, CdR – Observatoire de Genève, Raoul Behrend
 Discovery Circumstances: Numbered Minor Planets (1)-(5000) – Minor Planet Center
 
 

001053
Discoveries by Max Wolf
Named minor planets
19251116